Black Widow is a multidirectional shooter developed by Atari, Inc. and  released in arcades in 1982. The game uses color vector graphics. The player controls a black widow spider via two joysticks, one to move and one to fire, defending the web from insects.

Black Widow was offered as a conversion kit for Gravitar (1982), a game which was not commercially successful. The kit uses the original Gravitar PCB with a few modifications and a new set of ROM chips. Many factory-built Black Widow machines were produced using unsold Gravitar cabinets with Black Widow side-art applied over the Gravitar sideart.

Gameplay

To destroy certain enemies, the player must lure other enemies into destroying them. There is also the Bug Slayer, a bug that helps the player eliminate enemies, with only loss of potential points being the only consequence. The Bug Slayer can help the player in tough situations, but can also prevent the player from achieving the number of extra lives necessary to endure later, more difficult, rounds.

Other enemies appear on the playing field as eggs, laid by other enemies. The player can move these eggs off the playing field to both eliminate the enemy and receive points, before it reaches maturity.

Enemies and Scoring
 Mosquito - If shot, becomes '$'.
 Beetle - Eats '$', but if shot, becomes '$'.
 Hornet - Lays an egg on '$', but if shot, becomes '$'.
 Egg - Grows to become hornet or spoiler. Must be pushed off the web to score 500, 1000, 1500, 2000, or even 2500 points.
 Grub Steak - Tag for 500, 250, 100, or 50 points—the sooner the better.
 Spoiler - Invulnerable. Can only be destroyed by a grenade bug, bug slayer or rocket bug.
 Grenade Bug - Explodes if shot. Bugs and eggs within the kill zone score 500 points each.
 Rocket Bug - Invulnerable. Launches "rockettes" at black widow from the other bugs it tags. Shoot rockettes to score 1000 points each.
 Thunderbug - If shot, it breaks formation and attacks. If shot again, it explodes all other T-bugs for 5000 points. Keep away from all T-bugs to earn 10000 points. The resulting chain reaction from multiple thunderbugs is very dangerous and can encompass over 80% of the level at some times, depending on how many T-bugs are involved.
 Bug Slayer - Harmless to the player and invulnerable. The Bug Slayer competes with the Black Widow for food. Beat it to its flashing prey for points

Reception
Black Widow topped the US RePlay arcade chart for software conversion kits in May 1983.

Legacy
Black Widow was included in Atari Anniversary Edition Redux for the Sony PlayStation, released in 2001. In 2003, Microsoft Windows could play Black Widow as part of Atari - 80 Classic Games in One!. Released in 2004, Atari Anthology ported the game to the PlayStation 2 and Xbox gaming consoles, and in 2005, the Nokia N-Gage cellular phone received a copy of Black Widow in Atari Masterpieces Volume 1.

James Vollandt holds the official record for this game with a maximum 930,100 points.

On 29 September 2021, Atari announced a remake, Black Widow: Recharged for consoles (including the Atari VCS) and PC.  It was released on 28 October 2021.

References

External links

Black Widow at the Arcade History database
Rare Game Room Gems: Black Widow by Atari at The GameRoom Blog
Caught in the Web: An Appreciation of Ataris Black Widow at the Retroist

1982 video games
Arcade video games
Arcade-only video games
Atari games
Atari arcade games
Twin-stick shooters
Vector arcade video games
Video games about insects
Video games developed in the United States
Video games about spiders
Single-player video games